This is a list of airports in Idaho (a U.S. state), grouped by type and sorted by location. It contains all public-use and military airports in the state. Some private-use and former airports may be included where notable, such as airports that were previously public-use, those with commercial enplanements recorded by the FAA or airports assigned an IATA airport code.



Airports

NOTE: Moscow, Idaho is served by the Pullman-Moscow Regional Airport (FAA: PUW), a commercial service – primary airport located four miles away in Pullman, Washington.

See also 

 Idaho World War II Army Airfields
 Wikipedia:WikiProject Aviation/Airline destination lists: North America#Idaho

References 

Federal Aviation Administration (FAA):
 FAA Airport Data (Form 5010) from National Flight Data Center (NFDC), also available from AirportIQ 5010
 National Plan of Integrated Airport Systems (2017–2021), released September 2016
 Passenger Boarding (Enplanement) Data for CY 2019 and 2020, updated November 8, 2021

Idaho Transportation Department (ITD):
 Division of Aeronautics

Other sites used as a reference when compiling and updating this list:
 
 Aviation Safety Network – used to check IATA airport codes
 Great Circle Mapper: Airports in Idaho – used to check IATA and ICAO airport codes
 Abandoned & Little-Known Airfields: Idaho – used for information on former airports

 
Airports
Idaho
Airports